Burton Independent School District is a public school district based in Burton, Texas (USA).

In 2009, the school district was rated "academically acceptable" by the Texas Education Agency.

History

Karen Steenken, the principal of the junior-senior high school, announced she would resign in January 2019. She had worked for Burton ISD for 16 years.

Schools
Burton High/Junior High (Grades 7-12)
Burton Elementary (Grades PK-6)

References

External links

School districts in Washington County, Texas